Castiglion Fibocchi is a comune (municipality) in the Province of Arezzo in the Italian region Tuscany, located about  southeast of Florence and about  northwest of Arezzo.

Castiglion Fibocchi borders the following municipalities: Arezzo, Capolona, Laterina Pergine Valdarno, Loro Ciuffenna, Talla, Terranuova Bracciolini.

Sister cities
 Veurey-Voroize, France, since 1991.

References

Cities and towns in Tuscany